The Passionate Pilgrim (1599) is an anthology of 20 poems collected and published by William Jaggard that were attributed to "W. Shakespeare" on the title page, only five of which are considered authentically Shakespearean. These are two sonnets, later to be published in the 1609 collection of Shakespeare's Sonnets, and three poems extracted from the play Love's Labour's Lost. Five were attributed to other poets during his lifetime, and two were published in other collections anonymously. While most critics disqualify the rest as not Shakespearean on stylistic grounds, stylometric analysis by Ward Elliott and Robert Valenza put two blocks of the poems (4, 6, 7 and 9, and 10, 12, 13 and 15) within Shakespeare's stylistic boundaries. Jaggard later published an augmented edition with poems he knew to be by Thomas Heywood.

Textual history
The Passionate Pilgrim was first published in octavo by William Jaggard, probably in 1599 or possibly the year before, since the printer, Thomas Judson, had set up shop after September 1598. The date cannot be fixed with certainty, as the work was not entered in the Stationers' Register and the first edition title page is not extant. The last six poems are preceded by a second title page, headed "Sonnets to Sundry Notes of Music". There is no clear reason for the division.

The first edition (O1) survives only in two sheets (poems 1–5, 16–18) preserved at the Folger Shakespeare Library in a fragmentary composite copy (ESTC S107201) intermixed with sheets of the second edition that were probably added to replace defective leaves.

Two copies of the second edition (O2) dated 1599 survive (ESTC S106363), one in the Wren Library of Trinity College, Cambridge, and the other in the Huntington Library. The title page of this second edition states that the book is to be sold by stationer William Leake; Leake had obtained the rights to Shakespeare's Venus and Adonis in 1596 and published five octavo editions of that poem (the third edition through the eighth) in the 1599–1602 period.

Jaggard issued an expanded edition of The Passionate Pilgrim in 1612 (ESTC S106170), containing additional poems on the theme of Helen of Troy, announced on the title page ("Whereunto is newly added two Love Epistles, the first from Paris to Hellen, and Hellen's answere back again to Paris"). These were in fact taken from Thomas Heywood's Troia Britannica, which Jaggard had published in 1609. Heywood protested the piracy in his Apology for Actors (1612), writing that Shakespeare was "much offended" with Jaggard for making "so bold with his name." Jaggard withdrew the attribution to Shakespeare from unsold copies of the 1612 edition. Two copies of PPO3 survive, one in the Folger Library with the original title page, and the other in the Bodleian Library at the University of Oxford with the cancel title page omitting Shakespeare's name.

The poems in The Passionate Pilgrim were reprinted in John Benson's 1640 edition of Shakespeare's Poems, along with the Sonnets, A Lover's Complaint, The Phoenix and the Turtle, and other pieces. Thereafter the anthology was included in collections of Shakespeare's poems, in Bernard Lintott's 1709 edition and subsequent editions.

Variants between editions

The poems (1599 edition)

See also
 Shakespeare Apocrypha

Notes and references

Notes

References

Sources

Further reading

External links

 

Poetry by William Shakespeare
1599 books
Shakespeare apocrypha